Hamid Ahmadi can refer to:
 Hamid Ahmadi (historian) (b. 1945), Iranian historian
 Hamid Ahmadi (futsal) (b. 1988), Iranian futsal player
 Hamid Ahmadi (computer scientist), computer scientist for Motorola